Thalassinoides is an ichnogenus of trace fossil used to refer to "dichotomously or T-branched boxworks, mazes and shafts, unlined and unornamented". Facies of Thalassinoides increased suddenly in abundance at the beginning of the Mesozoic. Such burrows are made by a number of organisms, including the sea anemone Cerianthus, Balanoglossus and fishes, but are most closely associated with decapod crustaceans of the (former) infraorder Thalassinidea.

Gallery

References

External links
 Chuck D. Howell's Ichnogenera Photos

Arthropod trace fossils
Fish trace fossils
Thalassinidea
Paleozoic life of Manitoba